Ashanpur railway station is a railway station located in Ashanpur, Sindh, Pakistan. It is operated by the Pakistan Railways and serves as a stop on the Hyderabad-Mirpur Khas railway line.

The station was built in 1905 during the British Raj as a part of the Sindh Railway system. It is one of the oldest railway stations in Pakistan. Ashanpur Railway Station is situated at an altitude of 169 meters (554 feet) above sea level and is located in the Ashanpur railway station vicinity, which is on the Hyderabad-Mirpur Khas main line.

The station is equipped with basic amenities such as a waiting room, ticketing counters, and food stalls. It is also connected to the main road that links the station to Hyderabad, Mirpur Khas, and other nearby cities.

The station is also served by several express and freight train services. The Hyderabad Express, which runs between Hyderabad and Mirpur Khas, stops at the station. Other trains that stop at the station include the Nawabshah Express, the Jacobabad Express, and the Sukkur Express.

The station is operated and maintained by the Pakistan Railways. The Pakistan Railways is responsible for the maintenance and operation of the railway network in Pakistan. It also manages the ticketing and reservation systems, as well as the freight and passenger services.

See also
 List of railway stations in Pakistan
 Pakistan Railways

References

External links

Muzaffargarh
Transport in Muzaffargarh
Railway stations in Muzaffargarh District
Railway stations on Kotri–Attock Railway Line (ML 2)
Buildings and structures in Muzaffargarh